Giano Vetusto is a comune (municipality) in the Province of Caserta in the Italian region Campania, located about  north of Naples and about  northwest of Caserta.

Giano's Fractions are: Pozzillo, Fontana, Fontanella, Villa and Curti. Rocciano also used to be a fraction of Giano Vetusto, but it's no longer inhabited. The names is probably connected to the presence of ancient temple of Ianus in the area.

Notable people
Dominick Pezzulo

References

Cities and towns in Campania